The Redline 25, sometimes called the C&C 25 Redline, is a Canadian sailboat, that was designed by C&C Design and first built in 1969.

C&C also built an unrelated design with a similar name, the C&C 25.

Production
The boat was built by Bruckman Manufacturing in Canada starting in 1969. Bruckman became part of C&C Yachts that same year and C&C continued to produce the boat. The design is now out of production.

Design

The Redline 25 is a small recreational keelboat, built predominantly of fiberglass, with wood trim. It has a masthead sloop rig, a transom-hung rudder and a small fixed fin keel, with a retractable centreboard. The boat displaces  and carries  of ballast.

The boat is normally fitted with an outboard motor.

The boat has a PHRF racing average handicap of 237 with a high of 237 and low of 240.

See also
List of sailing boat types

Similar sailboats
Bayfield 25
Beneteau First 25.7
Beneteau First 25S
Beneteau First 260 Spirit
Bombardier 7.6
Cal 25
C&C 25
Capri 25
Catalina 25
Catalina 250
Dufour 1800
Hunter 25.5
Jouët 760
Kelt 7.6
Kirby 25
MacGregor 25
Merit 25
Mirage 25
Northern 25
O'Day 25
Sirius 26
Tanzer 25
US Yachts US 25

References

External links

Keelboats
1960s sailboat type designs
Sailing yachts
Sailboat type designs by C&C Design
Sailboat types built by C&C Yachts